The figure-of-nine loop is a type of knot to form a fixed loop in a rope.  Tied in the bight, it is made similarly to a figure-of-eight loop but with an extra half-turn before finishing the knot.

Also similar to the stevedore loop, the figure-nine loop is generally shown as being based on an intermediate form between the figure-eight knot and the stevedore knot.  The Ashley Book of Knots shows this intermediate knot, in stopper form, as #521.

While it uses more rope and is bulkier than the figure-of-eight loop, the figure-nine loop is somewhat stronger and less likely to jam.  It is sometimes used instead of a figure-of-eight loop to attach a rope to an anchor point or belay.

Tying

Figure-of-nine knot
The knot can also be tied with the end of a rope - a single strand replaces the double strand, and therefore a naked end replaces the loop. This knot can be rearranged to form a stopper knot, in the same manner as a figure-of-eight stopper knot.

References

Climbing knots